German submarine U-3 was a Type IIA U-boat laid down at the Deutsche Werke in Kiel on 11 February 1935 as yard number 238. She was commissioned into the Kriegsmarine on 6 August 1936 under the command of Oberleutnant zur See (Oblt.z.S.) Hans Meckel.

U-3 carried out a total of five combat patrols; she sank two ships while under the command of Joachim Schepke. During April 1940, she was part of the fleet that supported the German invasion of Norway, Operation Weserübung.

As the Type II submarines were too small for combat duty in the Atlantic Ocean, she was assigned to the Baltic for training duties with the 21st U-boat Flotilla, a training outfit.

Emblem
U-3 is known to have had three emblems; one was an oak leaf, with an anchor and a knife or dagger.

Design
U-3 had a displacement of  when at the surface and  while submerged. She had two shafts and two  propellers.

U-3 was fitted with three  torpedo tubes at the bow, five torpedoes or up to twelve Type A torpedo mines, and a  anti-aircraft gun. The boat had a complement of 25.

Operational history

First and second patrols
The boat's first patrol was relatively uneventful.

Her second sortie was toward the British east Anglian coast.

Third patrol

U-3 closed Vendia and as was common practice in the early days of the war, ordered her to stop after a few warning shots were fired. The ship's fate is disputed. The German submariners said the Danish vessel tried to ram the U-boat. The ship's crew were convinced she swung with the strength of the wind. A torpedo was fired which hit the vessel and sank her.

U-3 fired a torpedo at the British submarine, which missed; indeed they were not aware they had been targeted. The Thistle left the area and came across a lifeboat from Gun, telling the Swedes in it to return to their ship as she was still afloat. The German boarding party had left the ship in a lifeboat, but were picked up by the Danish merchant ship Dagmar. U-3 recovered them and put a torpedo into the empty Gun.

Fourth and fifth patrols

Fate
U-3 was stricken on 1 August 1944 in Gotenhafen. She was captured by Great Britain on 3 May 1945 and scrapped that same year.

Summary of raiding history

References

Bibliography

*

External links

German Type II submarines
U-boats commissioned in 1935
Captured U-boats
World War II submarines of Germany
1935 ships
Ships built in Kiel